Binibining Pilipinas 1964 was the 1st edition of Binibining Pilipinas, under the leadership of Stella Marquez-Araneta. It took place at the Araneta Coliseum in Quezon City, Philippines on July 5, 1964. It was supposedly scheduled on July 3, 1964, but it was moved to two days after due to Typhoon Danding that affected Manila and Central Luzon.

At the end of event, Lalaine Bennett, Miss Philippines 1963, crowned Myrna Panlilio as the first Binibining Pilipinas. Milagros Cataag was named Binibining Waling-waling (First Runner-Up), while Elvira Gonzales was named Binibining Ilang-Ilang (Second Runner-Up).

Results

Color keys
  The contestant did not place.

Candidates
15 delegates have been selected to compete in this year.

References 

1964
1964 beauty pageants